Pyrgocythara vicina is a species of sea snail, a marine gastropod mollusk in the family Mangeliidae.

Description
The length of the shell attains 4.3 mm.

Distribution
This marine species occurs off Jamaica.
.

References

 Adams, C. B. 1850. Description of supposed new species of marine shells which inhabit Jamaica. Contributions to Conchology, 4: 56–68, 109–123

External links
 

vicina
Gastropods described in 1850